Kartileh-Al Gamil is a football club based in Djibouti City, Djibouti.

In 2009, it participated in the CECAFA Club Cup.

References

Football clubs in Djibouti